The Federal Constitutional Court (usually abbreviated ) is the federal constitutional court of Germany. It is the highest independent constitutional organ of the German judiciary, ranking equally with the other supreme federal courts, and is – at the same time – the highest federal court in Germany. 

Today, 16 justices serve on the two senates of the court. This article lists the current justices of the court, and its former presidents, vice-presidents as well as all former justices.

Current justices of the Federal Constitutional Court 
The Court is divided into two senates, each with different subject-matter jurisdiction. The court's two senates were originally staffed with twelve justices each. With effect from 1963, the number of justices per senate was reduced to eight. The eight justices per senate include the president and the vice-president of the Federal Constitutional Court, who each preside over one of the court's two senates.

First senate 
Eight justices currently serve on the first senate of the Federal Constitutional Court. Listed in order of seniority, they are:

Second senate 
Eight justices currently serve on the second senate of the Federal Constitutional Court. Listed in order of seniority, they are:

Presidents of the Federal Constitutional Court 

To date, 10 persons have served as presidents of the Federal Constitutional Court. In chronological order, they are:

Vice-presidents of the Federal Constitutional Court 
To date, 15 persons have served as vice-presidents of the Federal Constitutional Court. Listed in chronological order, they are:

Justices of the Federal Constitutional Court 
Since the establishment of the Federal Constitutional Court in 1951, 115 justices (including presidents and vice-presidents) have served on the Court. The shortest tenure on the court was only 133 days, while the longest serving member of the court served for 26 years and 56 days (Willi Geiger).

The court's justices are elected by the Bundestag and the Bundesrat, and are appointed by the President of Germany. According to Article 94 of the German Basic Law, both constitutional bodies elect half of the members of the two senates.

The 115 justices are listed below in chronological order. If the date of their assumption of office – their appointment – is identical, the lower seat number is decisive for the purposes of this list.

Key 
 Justice: States the name of the justice. In brackets the year of birth for justices, who are still alive, and the year of birth and death for justices, who have died, are given.
 Position (seat): The office of the justice is given (i.e. president, vice-president or justice). In brackets the seat number is provided: It is composed of the number of the Senate (1 or 2), the electoral body (Bundestag [BT] or Bundesrat [BR]), the respective seat of the justice (1 to 6) and a number corresponding to the chronological occupancy of the seat. Example: The indication "1 BR 4.3" shows that the justice is the third to occupy the fourth seat of the group of justices elected by the Bundesrat to the first senate.
 Senate: States on which senate the respective justice has served.
 Tenure (as justice): 
 First date: Specifies the date on which the justice assumed his or her office. This date is not identical with the date of his or her election.
 Last date: Indicates the last day of the term of office of the justice. In case of sitting justices, they are marked as "incumbent".
 Tenure length: States the length of time a justice is or was in office.
 Proposal: States which German political party proposed the respective justice for their office.
 : Gives a reference for the information provided in the specific row of the table.

Notes

References

Bibliography 
 
 
 

Justices of the Federal Constitutional Court
Lists of German judges
Germany